Carl Hartman may refer to:

Carl Hartman (botanist) (1824–1884), Swedish botanist, son of Carl Johan Hartman, with the botanical author abbreviation C.Hartm. 
Carl Johan Hartman (1790–1849), Swedish physician and botanist, with the botanical author abbreviation Hartm.
Carl Vilhelm Hartman (1862–1941), Swedish botanist and anthropologist, with the botanical author abbreviation C.V.Hartm.

See also
Carl Hartmann (disambiguation)